Rimini Rimini is a 1987 Italian anthology comedy film directed by Sergio Corbucci. It consists of five segments, all set in Rimini. The film has a sequel, Rimini Rimini - Un anno dopo, directed by Bruno Corbucci and released in 1988.

Plot 

The film is divided into episodes set on the beaches of Rimini. Gildo (Paolo Villaggio) is a moralistic magistrate who shuts down red light districts but his enemies conspire to photograph him in a compromising position with sex goddess Lola (Serena Grandi). Laura Antonelli plays a wealthy woman who believes her husband has drowned. A priest is forced to put his mouth on a topless nun as the battle of morality verses misbehavior unfolds. A shy girl is forced to fall in love; a priest falls in love with a nun; and a poor employee is forced to do menial jobs to his master for not being fired.

Cast 

 Paolo Villaggio as Ermenegildo "Gildo" Morelli
 Serena Grandi as Lola / Ramona
 Jerry Calà as Gianni Bozzi
 Laura Antonelli as Noce Bovi
 Andrea Roncato as Don Andrea
 Eleonora Brigliadori as Liliana
 Maurizio Micheli as Pino Tricarico 	
 Paolo Bonacelli as Pedercini 
 Sylva Koscina as Countess Pedercini 
 Livia Romano as Marisa 
 Adriano Pappalardo as Gustavo 
 Monica Scattini as Simona 
 Elvire Audray as Suora
 Gigi Sammarchi as Massimiliano "Max" Ponchielli 
 Sebastiano Somma as Jerry 
 Giuliana Calandra as Jerry's Wife
 Arnaldo Ninchi as Arnaldo
 Camillo Milli as Dr. Piedimonte

Music 

The theme song, "Rimini Splash Down" was produced by La Bionda and performed by Righeira.

References

External links

1987 films
1987 comedy films
1980s Italian-language films
Films directed by Sergio Corbucci
Italian comedy films
Films set in Emilia-Romagna
1980s Italian films